Keezhamaligai is a village in the Sendurai taluk of Ariyalur district, Tamil Nadu, India.

Demographics 

As per the 2001 census, Keezhamaligai had a total population of 3,019 with 1,484 males and 1,534 females.

References 

Villages in Ariyalur district